Richard Christopher Rodgers II (born January 22, 1992) is an American football tight end for the Los Angeles Chargers of the National Football League (NFL). He played college football at California and was drafted by the Green Bay Packers in the third round of the 2014 NFL Draft. He has also been a member of the Philadelphia Eagles, Washington Football Team and Arizona Cardinals.

Early life
Rodgers was born in California, growing up there and Oregon and New Mexico before moving to Worcester, Massachusetts in 2004. He attended St. John's High School in Shrewsbury. At St. John's he was a four-time letterman in basketball and three-time letterman in football for the Pioneers. While on the basketball team, he led the Pioneers to the state championship game all four years, including a win in 2009. As a senior, he averaged 17.8 points, 10.8 rebounds, 4.5 blocks, 4.1 steals and 3.4 assists playing basketball. Rodgers was named to the starting five on ESPNBoston's MIAA All-State Boys Basketball Team along with other talented players from Massachusetts such as seniors Pat Connaughton and Jake Layman as well. He is one of 14 athletes in Saint John's history to be a member of the 1000 Point Scorers List, with 1423 points. In football, he helped lead the Pioneers to central Massachusetts super bowl championship wins his last two years. Former Pittsburgh Steelers tight end Rob Blanchflower was also a teammate of Rodgers in football and basketball at St. John's.

Prior to the start of his senior year, Rodgers committed to attend the University of California, Berkeley, where his father Richard Rodgers Sr., who also played football, handled two of the five laterals in "The Play".

Rodgers is cousins with Jairus Byrd.

College career
Rodgers played in 35 of 37 possible games (starting 11) for the California Golden Bears during three seasons from 2011–13. He had 20 catches for 288 yards as a 2012 sophomore. He had his best season in 2013 as a junior, when he totaled career highs of 39 receptions and 608 yards receiving to rank third on the team in both categories. He finished his career at Cal with 59 receptions for 896 yards receiving (15.2 yards per catch) and two touchdown catches.

Statistics

Professional career

Green Bay Packers

Rodgers was selected in the third round with the 98th overall pick by the Green Bay Packers in the 2014 NFL Draft. On June 12, 2014, he signed a contract with the Packers. He made his NFL debut on September 4, 2014. He did not record a catch. In Week 4, he recorded his first two catches for 52 yards against the Chicago Bears. Rodgers' first NFL touchdown came in the second quarter of the Packers' November 23, 2014 matchup versus the Minnesota Vikings at TCF Bank Stadium. After rolling out far to his right, quarterback Aaron Rodgers completed a 1-yard touchdown pass across the width of the field to Richard Rodgers, who had completely avoided defensive coverage and was left standing alone in the corner of the endzone.

On December 3, 2015, in a Week 13 matchup against the Detroit Lions, Richard Rodgers caught a Hail Mary pass from Aaron Rodgers for 61 yards with 0:00 left to beat the Lions 27–23, after the game was extended due to a face mask penalty called on Detroit.According to Elias Sports Bureau, it is the longest game-winning, game-ending Hail Mary in NFL history. The Hail Mary was quickly dubbed as "The Miracle in Motown." After the game Richard Rodgers admitted thinking about "The Play" his father was part of stating "It's a really special moment for him and I was kind of thinking on the play before, when Aaron got the facemask, I was kind of thinking we would do something like that. Obviously it turned out differently."

Philadelphia Eagles
On April 4, 2018, the Philadelphia Eagles signed Rodgers to a one-year, $880,000 contract that included $200,000 guaranteed. He was placed on injured reserve on September 4, 2018 with a knee injury. He was activated off injured reserve on November 16, 2018. His only statistics were during a week 16 match against the Houston Texans, where he recorded one catch for 7 yards.

On March 28, 2019, Rodgers re-signed with the Eagles on a two-year contract. He was placed on injured reserve with a foot injury on August 30, 2019. He was released from injured reserve with an injury settlement on September 11. He was re-signed on December 24, 2019.

Washington Football Team
Rodgers signed with the Washington Football Team on April 6, 2020, uniting him with his father Richard Rodgers Sr. He was released on September 5, 2020.

Philadelphia Eagles (second stint)
On September 8, 2020, Rodgers signed back with the Philadelphia Eagles after an injury to Joshua Perkins. After stepping in for an injured Dallas Goedert, Rodgers became the starting tight end on Week 7 following an injury to Zach Ertz. In Week 11 against the Cleveland Browns, Rodgers caught two passes for 48 yards and his first touchdown since 2017. In Week 12 against the Seattle Seahawks, Rodgers caught a 33-yard Hail Mary pass from Carson Wentz in the last minute of the fourth quarter.

On June 11, 2021, Rodgers re-signed with the Eagles for the 2021 season. He was waived on August 31. He re-signed with their practice squad on September 21, 2021, but was released a week later.

Arizona Cardinals
Rodgers was signed to the Arizona Cardinals practice squad on October 13, 2021, but was released three days later.

Philadelphia Eagles (third stint)
Rodgers was signed to the Philadelphia Eagles' practice squad on October 20, 2021. He was signed to the active roster on January 15, 2022. He was placed on the Active/PUP list on July 27, 2022. He was released on August 30, 2022.

Los Angeles Chargers 
Rodgers was signed by the Los Angeles Chargers to their practice squad on September 5, 2022. He was promoted to the active roster on September 28. He was placed on injured reserve on December 10.

NFL career statistics

Regular season

Postseason

References

External links
California Golden Bears bio

1992 births
Living people
Players of American football from California
People from Martinez, California
Sportspeople from the San Francisco Bay Area
Players of American football from Worcester, Massachusetts
American football tight ends
California Golden Bears football players
Green Bay Packers players
Philadelphia Eagles players
African-American players of American football
Washington Football Team players
Arizona Cardinals players
21st-century African-American sportspeople
Los Angeles Chargers players